The 1952 United States presidential election in Michigan took place on November 4, 1952, as part of the 1952 United States presidential election. Voters chose 20 representatives, or electors, to the Electoral College, who voted for president and vice president.

Michigan was won by Columbia University President Dwight D. Eisenhower (Republican–New York), running with Senator Richard Nixon, with 55.44% of the popular vote, against Illinois Governor Adlai Stevenson (Democratic), running with Alabama Senator John Sparkman, with 43.97% of the popular vote, making Michigan 0.6% more Republican than the nation-at-large.

Results

Results by county

See also
 United States presidential elections in Michigan

References

Michigan
1952
1952 Michigan elections